Terrence Anthony (born March 9, 1968) is a former American football wide receiver. He played two seasons for the Tampa Bay Buccaneers, after a college career at Florida State.
At FSU, Anthony was one of the members of the football team's 'Fab Four Receiving Corp,' along with future Buccaneers teammate Lawrence Dawsey, former 49er and Packer Ronald Lewis and former Arena Football League receiver Bruce LaSane.

Anthony was injured in Week 16 of the 1991 NFL season, being carted off with a knee injury against the Chicago Bears at Soldier Field.

References 

1968 births
Living people
American football wide receivers
Florida State Seminoles football players
Tampa Bay Buccaneers players
Sportspeople from Daytona Beach, Florida
Players of American football from Florida